Yang Chao is a Chinese handball coach of the Chinese national team.

He coached them at the 2015 World Women's Handball Championship.

References

Year of birth missing (living people)
Living people
Chinese handball coaches
Place of birth missing (living people)